Andrey Yuryevich Molchanov (born 24 September 1971) is a Russian businessman. He is the founder and major shareholder of LSR Group (OJSC) and a former representative of Leningrad Oblast in the Federation Council of the Federal Assembly of the Russian Federation (2008-2013).

Education
In 1993 Molchanov graduated from the economic faculty of the Saint Petersburg State University, in 1998 graduated from the Russian Academy of Public Administration under the President of the Russian Federation (RAPA). Andrey Molchanov also holds a doctorate in Economic Sciences.

Business
In 1993 Molchanov founded and was president until 2007 of Open Joint Stock Company LSR Group, one of the leading real estate development, construction and building materials companies of Russia. Originally, at the LSR Group, his friends Grigory Vedernikov, Georgy Bogachev, Igor Levit, and Yevgeny Yatsyshin were the top management who received support from Mikhail Romanov, who was the general director of Stroydetal OJSC and is an uncle of Andrey Molchanov (b. 1957). While Molchanov was in the Federation Council, Mikhail Romanov was the Chairman of the Board at the LSR Group.

After leaving his post on the Federation Council in 2013, Molchanov returned to the LSR Group and became chairman of the board of directors from April 2013 until April 2015 and again from August 2018 to 2019. He has been Chairman of the Strategy and Investment Committee with the LSR Group since April 2015 and, since May 2015, the General Director, Chairman of the Management Board at the LSR Group. In 2015, he became a member of the board of directors with Razvitie LLC, and, between March 2016 and 2019, he was the President of the Association of National Association of Builders.

In April 2019, he reduced his ownership shares of the LSR Group to 50.33% by selling shares (9.71%) after which Forbes listed his wealth at $950 million.
 
He has been the General Director of the LSR Group since June 2019.

During the Trump Tower Moscow deal before Donald Trump became United States President, Molchanov owned the property at the location for the new Trump Tower in Moscow.

Politics
In 2007 Molchanov was appointed the Assistant of the Russian Federation public health services and social development Minister.

Andrey Molchanov was a member of the Federation Council representing Valeriy Serdyukov, the Governor of Leningrad Oblast (elected in January 2008), and the Chairman of the Council of Federation Committee on the Commonwealth of Independent States Issues (elected in December 2009). Representing Leningrad Oblast, he was on the Council of the Federation of the Federal Assembly for the Russian Federation from 2008 until 2013.

Oligarchs list
In January 2018, Molchanov was placed on the United States Department of Treasury "Oligarchs List" of persons who are close to Vladimir Putin.

Family
Molchanov is married and has six children.

His stepfather, Yuriy Molchanov, was a vice rector for international relations at Leningrad State University (LSU). He was the Deputy Governor of Saint Petersburg between 2004 and 2012.

Molchanov owns a $120 million yacht called Aurora. He also has Cypriot citizenship.

References

External links
Leningrad Oblast official site
Federation Council of Russia (in Russian)
LSR Group (OJSC)

Russian politicians
Russian businesspeople in real estate
Living people
1971 births
Russian billionaires
Members of the Federation Council of Russia (after 2000)
Recipients of the Medal of the Order "For Merit to the Fatherland" II class
Saint Petersburg State University alumni
Politicians from Saint Petersburg